Larry G. Pierce (July 18, 1950 – November 19, 2018) was an American comedic-country music singer.

Early life 
Pierce lived most of his life in the small central Indiana town of Middletown. Pierce spent most of his life working in an auto parts factory, then after 30 years was forced into retirement due to the closing of the plant. Pierce decided to write his first dirty song as kind of a joke, the song was titled "Love Letters", leading to more songs with dirty lyrics.

Career 
In 1993, someone (unknown to Pierce) submitted some of his songs to Laughing Hyena Records, a label that specializes in truck stop comedy, mainly distributed at truck stops across the United States. Shortly after the submission of the demo tape, Pierce began recording for Laughing Hyena Records, churning out 13 albums in 10 years. Each and every album packed with Pierce's unique style of dirty country music. During this time, unbeknown to him, Pierce developed a respectable size fan base across the United States, all without touring or any radio air play.

In 2003, he was approached by an independent film company from New York City (Milkhouse Productions) to do a full-length documentary on his life and career as a dirty country singer "Dirty Country Movie The Larry Pierce Story". As if this news was not exciting enough, in 2005 a raunchy touring rock band from Colorado Springs (itis) asked Pierce to do a live show with them in Minneapolis. Following the success of Pierce's first live show, outside of his hometown, Pierce and (itis) traveled the United States performing Pierce's brand of raunchy country music to sometimes stunned audiences. Taking a break from touring, Pierce recorded his fourteenth studio album called Pussywhipped. Pussywhipped was the first album to be released on Pierce's new label Hat Light Recordings and featuring his new-found band (itis). While recording Pussywhipped, Pierce received a call from The Howard Stern Show, he was then informed that his song "Good Hard Fuckin" was one of Howard Stern's favorite songs.

On January 9, 2007, Pierce made his first appearance on The Howard Stern Show and announced the release of Pussywhipped on the show. Since then, Pierce has become something of a regular on the show, including phone-ins and live appearances, while his music is often played coming in and out of radio breaks. Pierce continued to live up to his moniker as "The Master of Dirty Country Music", by continuing to record and sing his unique brand of dirty country music.

Live performance 
Usually accompanied by his band, Pierce's live performances exemplified his unique brand of dirty country music. Often comical antics by band members and the use of props complete the set. Pierce also performed acoustic solo shows, armed with just his acoustic guitar branded “Pussy” and his signature hat.

Discography

Albums

References

Sources

External links 
 
 
 

1950 births
2018 deaths
American country singer-songwriters
Country musicians from Indiana
Musicians from Indianapolis
People from Henry County, Indiana
Singer-songwriters from Indiana